Case Histories (2004) is a detective novel by British author Kate Atkinson and is set in Cambridge, England. It introduces Jackson Brodie, a former police inspector and now private investigator. The plot revolves around three seemingly unconnected family tragediesthe disappearance of a three-year-old girl from a garden; the murder of a husband by his wife with an axe; and the apparently motiveless murder of a solicitor's daughter. Case Histories has been described as Atkinson's breakthrough, and she has since published four additional novels featuring Brodie: One Good Turn (2006), When Will There Be Good News? (2008), Started Early, Took My Dog (2010) and Big Sky (2019).

Plot
'Case Histories' tells the story of Jackson Brodie, a private investigator who tries to find out the truth of some cases. Brodie meets some people who reclaim his help to solve their cases

Reviews

Kirkus Reviews found this novel revealing the talent Kate Atkinson showed in her first award-winning novel, “back on form” with this story. Atkinson is “a gripping storyteller”. This is a “compulsive page-turner that looks deep into the heart of sadness, cruelty, and loss,” which “ultimately grants her charming p.i. ... a chance at happiness and some measure of reconciliation with the past.”

Adaptations

An abridged audiobook adaptation of the book was released, with Jason Isaacs narrating the book.
An unabridged audiobook version of the book, narrated by Susan Jameson. 
A three-part television adaptation of Atkinson's first three books in the Brodie series was produced for the BBC under the blanket title Case Histories (2011).  It stars Jason Isaacs as Brodie. The adaptation of Case Histories itself was shown over consecutive nights on 5 June and 6 June 2011, followed by adaptations of One Good Turn (2006) and When Will There Be Good News? (2008) over the succeeding two weeks.

See also

2004 in literature
Lists of books

References

External links

Links to multiple reviews of Case Histories

2004 British novels
British mystery novels
British detective novels
Novels by Kate Atkinson
Novels set in Cambridge
Doubleday (publisher) books
British novels adapted into television shows
Novels with multiple narrators